Sarothruridae is a family of small- to medium-sized ground-living birds found mostly in Madagascar and sub-Saharan Africa, with the genus Rallicula being restricted to New Guinea and the Moluccas. The species in this family were once considered to sit with the larger rail family Rallidae.

The family contains 3 genera.

Genus Sarothrura (flufftails; 9 species)
 White-spotted flufftail, Sarothrura pulchra
 Buff-spotted flufftail, Sarothrura elegans
 Red-chested flufftail, Sarothrura rufa
 Chestnut-headed flufftail, Sarothrura lugens
 Streaky-breasted flufftail, Sarothrura boehmi
 Striped flufftail, Sarothrura affinis
 Madagascar flufftail, Sarothrura insularis
 White-winged flufftail, Sarothrura ayresi
 Slender-billed flufftail, Sarothrura watersi
Genus Mentocrex (wood rails; 2 species)
 Madagascar wood rail (Mentocrex kioloides)
 Tsingy wood rail (Mentocrex beankaensis)
Genus Rallicula (forest rails; 4 species)
 White-striped forest rail (Rallicula leucospila)
 Chestnut forest rail (Rallicula rubra)
 Forbes's forest rail (Rallicula forbesi)
 Mayr's forest rail (Rallicula mayri)

References